Proceratium is a rare genus of ants in the subfamily Proceratiinae. It is the type genus of the tribe Proceratiini, which in addition to Proceratium consists of two even rarer genera: the extant Discothyrea and the fossil genus Bradoponera.

Distribution
The genus is rare, but widespread throughout the northern temperate and tropical zones. In the Old World, it is distributed from Spain to Japan, in sub-Saharan Africa, Mauritius, the Malay Archipelago, New Guinea, Queensland (Australia) and Fiji. In the New World, it is known from Canada to Brazil (and some Caribbean islands).

Biology
Colonies are relatively small, usually containing less than 200 individuals. They nest in soil, in rotten wood, under stones, or on tree branches. Similar to its sister genus Discothyrea, some species are specialist predators of arthropod eggs, mainly spider eggs.

Species

Proceratium algiricum Forel, 1899
Proceratium angulinode Baroni Urbani & De Andrade, 2003
Proceratium arnoldi Forel, 1913
Proceratium australe Baroni Urbani & De Andrade, 2003
Proceratium austronesicum Baroni Urbani & De Andrade, 2003
Proceratium avium Brown, 1974
Proceratium banjaranense Baroni Urbani & De Andrade, 2003
Proceratium boltoni Leston, 1971
Proceratium brasiliense Borgmeier, 1959
Proceratium burundense Baroni Urbani & De Andrade, 2003
Proceratium caledonicum Baroni Urbani & De Andrade, 2003
Proceratium californicum Cook, 1953
Proceratium catio Baroni Urbani & De Andrade, 2003
Proceratium cavinodus Baroni Urbani & De Andrade, 2003
Proceratium chickasaw Baroni Urbani & De Andrade, 2003
Proceratium colombicum Baroni Urbani & De Andrade, 2003
Proceratium compitale Ward, 1988
Proceratium confinium Baroni Urbani & De Andrade, 2003
Proceratium convexiceps Borgmeier, 1957
Proceratium crassicorne Emery, 1895
Proceratium creek Baroni Urbani & De Andrade, 2003
Proceratium croceum (Roger, 1860)
Proceratium cubanum Baroni Urbani & De Andrade, 2003
Proceratium dayak Baroni Urbani & De Andrade, 2003
Proceratium deelemani Perrault, 1981
†Proceratium denticulatum Lattke, 1991
Proceratium diplopyx Brown, 1980
†Proceratium dominicanum Baroni Urbani & De Andrade, 2003
Proceratium dusun Baroni Urbani & De Andrade, 2003
Proceratium ecuadoriense Baroni Urbani & De Andrade, 2003
†Proceratium eocenicum Dlussky, 2009
Proceratium foveolatum Baroni Urbani & De Andrade, 2003
Proceratium galilaeum Baroni Urbani & De Andrade, 2003
†Proceratium gibberum Baroni Urbani & De Andrade, 2003
Proceratium gigas Baroni Urbani & De Andrade, 2003
Proceratium goliath Kempf & Brown, 1968
Proceratium google Fisher, 2005
Proceratium gracile Baroni Urbani & De Andrade, 2003
Proceratium hirsutum Baroni Urbani & De Andrade, 2003
Proceratium itoi (Forel, 1918)
Proceratium ivimka Baroni Urbani & De Andrade, 2003
Proceratium japonicum Santschi, 1937
Proceratium lattkei Baroni Urbani & De Andrade, 2003
Proceratium lombokense Emery, 1897
Proceratium longigaster Karavaiev, 1935
Proceratium longiscapus Baroni Urbani & De Andrade, 2003
Proceratium longmenense Xu, 2006
Proceratium lunatum Terron, 1981
Proceratium malesianum Baroni Urbani & De Andrade, 2003
Proceratium mancum Mann, 1922
Proceratium melinum (Roger, 1860)
Proceratium melitense Baroni Urbani & De Andrade, 2003
Proceratium mexicanum Baroni Urbani & De Andrade, 2003
Proceratium micrommatum (Roger, 1863)
Proceratium microsculptum Baroni Urbani & De Andrade, 2003
Proceratium morisitai Onoyama & Yoshimura, 2002
Proceratium nujiangense Xu, 2006
Proceratium numidicum Santschi, 1912
Proceratium oceanicum Baroni Urbani & De Andrade, 2003
Proceratium panamense Baroni Urbani & De Andrade, 2003
Proceratium papuanum Emery, 1897
Proceratium pergandei (Emery, 1895)
†Proceratium petrosum Dlussky, Rasnitsyn & Perfilieva, 2015
†Proceratium poinari Baroni Urbani & De Andrade, 2003
Proceratium politum Baroni Urbani & De Andrade, 2003
Proceratium pumilio Baroni Urbani & De Andrade, 2003
Proceratium relictum Mann, 1921

Proceratium robustum Baroni Urbani & De Andrade, 2003
Proceratium siamense Baroni Urbani & De Andrade, 2003
Proceratium silaceum Roger, 1863
Proceratium snellingi Baroni Urbani & De Andrade, 2003
Proceratium stictum Brown, 1958
Proceratium striativenter Baroni Urbani & De Andrade, 2003
Proceratium sulawense Baroni Urbani & De Andrade, 2003
Proceratium taino Baroni Urbani & De Andrade, 2003
Proceratium terraealtae Baroni Urbani & De Andrade, 2003
Proceratium terroni Bolton, 1995
Proceratium tio Snelling & Cover, 1992
Proceratium toschii (Consani, 1951)
Proceratium transitionis Baroni Urbani & De Andrade, 2003
Proceratium vinaka Hita Garcia, Sarnat, & Economo, 2015
Proceratium watasei (Wheeler, 1906)
Proceratium williamsi Mathew & Tiwari, 2000
Proceratium zhaoi Xu, 2000

References

External links

Proceratiinae
Ant genera